OzGirl is an Australian web series that ran from February to June, 2009. The series consists of 24 episodes, of between five and seven minutes each.  The final episode was broadcast live on-air.

Story
OzGirl tells the story of Sadie Brown, a small-town, country girl who moves to Melbourne, where she lives with her cousin Megan. The show explores Sadie's efforts to make friends, get a job, pursue her passion for photography, meet "Mr. Right", fall in love, and find her long-lost mother.

It started out as an experiment in the use of social networking as a medium for building a community.

OzGirl established a "solid audience across a range of platforms including Fairfax Digital, Virgin Australia, KoldCast TV, Apple iTunes, Microsoft Zune and TiVo."
The series has been described as "Australia's first social web show in which the characters exist within the audience's existing social networks and interact with them as they would if they were real people."

Cast
 Sophie Tilson - Sadie Brown
 Shanrah Wakefield - Megan Brown
 Richard Askin - George Sullivan
 Nicola Collie - Lisa
 Joel Famularo - Tony
 James O'Halloran - Patrick
 Janet Watson Kruse - Robyn Brown
 Bradley Williams - Hot Guy

Recognition and awards
 2009 ITVFest (Independent Television Festival) – Best Web Series
 2009 ITVFest (Independent Television Festival) – Best Acting
 2010 Streamy Award - Best Foreign Web Series

References

External links
 Official website
 

2009 web series debuts
2009 web series endings
Australian comedy web series
Streamy Award-winning channels, series or shows